Embrace were a short-lived hardcore punk band from Washington, D.C., which lasted from the summer of 1985 to the spring of 1986. Along with Rites of Spring, and Beefeater, it was one of the mainstay acts of the 1985 Revolution Summer movement, and was one of the first bands to be dubbed in the press as emotional hardcore, though the members had rejected the term since its creation. The band included lead vocalist Ian MacKaye of the defunct hardcore punk act Minor Threat and three former members of his brother Alec's band, the Faith: guitarist Michael Hampton, drummer Ivor Hanson, and bassist Chris Bald. Hampton and Hanson had also previously played together in S.O.A. The band played their first show on July 28, 1985 at Food for Thought, a former restaurant and music venue located on Washington, D.C.'s Dupont Circle; their ninth and final show was held at the 9:30 Club in March 1986. The only recording released by the quartet was their posthumous 1987 self-titled album, Embrace, being influenced by the Faith EP Subject to Change.

Following the breakup of Embrace, MacKaye and ex-Minor Threat drummer, Jeff Nelson, tried turning their recent one-off musical experiment in England, dubbed "Egg Hunt", into an actual band, but the project never made it past the rehearsal stage. Hampton, for his part, teamed up with former members of Rites of Spring to form the short-lived post-hardcore outfit One Last Wish, while Bald moved on to the band Ignition. MacKaye eventually directed his energy and creativity toward the forming of Fugazi in 1987, and Ivor Hanson would pair up with Hampton again in 1988 for Manifesto.

During the band's formative years, some fans started referring to them and fellow innovators Rites of Spring as emocore (emotive hardcore) bands, a term MacKaye publicly disagreed with.

Discography

Albums
 Embrace (1987)

Compilation appearances
 20 Years of Dischord (2002)

See also
 Revolution Summer

References

Citations

Sources 
 Works cited

External links
 Zararity (December 29, 2014). Embrace - Live at the 9:30 Club, Washington, D.C. 1986 (Complete and remastered) (Embrace's final show). YouTube.

American emo musical groups
American post-hardcore musical groups
Hardcore punk groups from Washington, D.C.
Dischord Records artists
First-wave emo bands